Steven Cay (sometimes spelled Steven May or Meeren Cay) is a small scrub-covered and rocky Caribbean island, about 28 feet high and situated 0.5 miles west of Cruz Bay on Saint John in the United States Virgin Islands. It is a popular destination for snorkelers and scuba divers,.

Flora and fauna
Steven Cay waters feature coral reefs and sea fans, mountain corals, star corals, large quantities of angel- and triggerfish, as well as lobsters, nurse sharks and pillar corals.

References 

Uninhabited islands of the United States Virgin Islands